Skiff is a hamlet in southern Alberta, Canada within the County of Forty Mile No. 8.

Demographics 
Skiff recorded a population of 10 in the 1991 Census of Population conducted by Statistics Canada.

Notable people
 Earl W. Bascom (1906-1995), rodeo pioneer, inventor, "Father of Modern Rodeo," cowboy artist and sculptor, Hollywood actor, hall of fame inductee, worked on the Hat L Ranch near Skiff

Skiff Meteorite
Skiff farmer Bill Nemeth found a meteorite in the ground on his farm (NE1/4-31-3-4-W4) in 1966. Twelve years later he sold it to the U of A Geology department. The date of its landing is unknown, but evidence says it was not very old, geologically speaking.

See also 
List of communities in Alberta
List of hamlets in Alberta

References 

County of Forty Mile No. 8
Hamlets in Alberta